Hardy (formerly, Hardyville and Hardy Creek) is an unincorporated community in Mendocino County, California.

A post office operated at Hardy from 1902 to 1915. The name honors R.A. Hardy, who owned a wharf nearby.
The mill at Hardy Creek (which was around the point from Juan Creek) was part of the Cottoneva Lumber Co. at Rockport. The mill had a wharf and a railroad. The town had a large hotel. The mill was operated by E. T. Dusenbury, one of the owners of the Cottoneva Lumber Co. The mill was destroyed by fire and was never rebuilt.

References

Unincorporated communities in California
Unincorporated communities in Mendocino County, California
Populated coastal places in California